Pierce L. Richards (May 13, 1905 – April 4, 1989) was an American football player.

A native of Lansdowne, Pennsylvania, Richards played college football for Swarthmore. He played professional football in the National Football League (NFL) as a center for the Frankford Yellow Jackets during 1927 season. He appeared in a total of three NFL games, one as a starter.

References

1905 births
1989 deaths
People from Lansdowne, Pennsylvania
American football centers
Swarthmore Garnet Tide football players
Frankford Yellow Jackets players
Players of American football from Pennsylvania